Susan M. Ford (born September 20, 1943) is a Democratic former member of the New Hampshire House of Representatives for Grafton County's 3rd district. The 3rd district includes the towns of Bath, Benton, Easton, Landaff, Orford, Piermont and Warren. She has represented Grafton's 3rd district from 2008 to 2010 and from 2012 to 2020.

References

External links
 Biography at New Hampshire General Court

1943 births
Living people
Democratic Party members of the New Hampshire House of Representatives
Women state legislators in New Hampshire
People from Grafton County, New Hampshire
Hiram College alumni
Northern Illinois University alumni
21st-century American politicians
21st-century American women politicians